Per Olav Wiken (March 23, 1937 – January 14, 2011) was a Norwegian sailor and Olympic medalist.

He received a silver medal in the Star class at the 1968 Summer Olympics in Mexico City, together with Peder Lunde, jr.

References

External links

1937 births
2011 deaths
Norwegian male sailors (sport)
Olympic sailors of Norway
Sailors at the 1968 Summer Olympics – Star
Olympic silver medalists for Norway
Olympic medalists in sailing
Medalists at the 1968 Summer Olympics